Boca Juniors is an Argentine sports club that is notable for its professional football team. The chronological list comprises all those who have held the position of head coach since the start of the professional era in 1930. Each head coach's entry includes his career with the club and the titles won. Caretaker head coaches are included, where known, as well as those who have been in permanent charge.

The most successful head coach in terms of titles won is Carlos Bianchi with 9. Titles include 4 Primera División leagues, 3 Copa Libertadores, and 2 Intercontinental Cups between 1998 and 2003.

Head coaches

Notes

Winning managers

References

b
b